AMDA-Nepal (Association of Medical Doctors of Asia-Nepal) is humanitarian, nonprofit-making, nonpolitical, non-sectarian, non-governmental organization working with its mission to promote the health and well-being of the underprivileged and marginalized people of Nepal.

Objectives
Initiate, promote and strengthen the country’s health services through national and international cooperation with principles of political non-alignment, equality and non-discrimination
Facilitates medical doctors to enrich their professional expertise through mutual exchange of experience, research findings and standardization of services among themselves
Establish coordination and functional relationship with other relevant national and international organizations, agencies or governments in carrying out its mission
Accord priority to serve the communities that are more needy and/or are in immediate distress

References

Medical and health organisations based in Nepal